A Sertoli cell nodule is a benign proliferation of Sertoli cells that arises in association with cryptorchidism (undescended testis).  They are not composed of a clonal cell population, i.e. neoplastic; thus, technically, they should not be called an adenoma.


Pathology
Sertoli cell nodules are unencapsulated nodules that consist of:
 cells arranged in well-formed tubules (that vaguely resemble immature Sertoli cells), with
 bland hyperchromatic oval/round nuclei that are stratified, and
 may contain eosinophilic (hyaline) blob in lumen (centre).

References

Further reading
 Testis, Sex Cord Stromal Tumor - eMedicine.
 
 

Testicle disorders
Men's health